Zach Bauer (born May 23, 1985 in St. Louis, Missouri) is an American soccer player who played in 2010 for AC St. Louis in the USSF Division 2 Professional League.

Career

College
Bauer grew up in St. Charles, Missouri and attended Christian Brothers College High School where he was a second team All State soccer player as a senior. He played one year of college soccer at Boston University, where he appeared for three games, before transferring to the Southern Illinois University Edwardsville as a sophomore. At Edwardsville he started all 22 games in 2006 picking up Great Lakes Valley Conference first team honors along with Great Lakes All-Region first team honors and NSCAA/adidas NCAA Division II All-Great Lakes Region second team honors.

Professional
Bauer signed his first professional contract in 2010 when he was signed by AC St. Louis of the USSF Division 2 Professional League. He made his professional debut on April 10, 2010 in St. Louis's first ever game, against Carolina RailHawks

References

External links
 AC St. Louis bio
 SIUE bio

1985 births
Living people
American soccer players
Boston University Terriers men's soccer players
SIU Edwardsville Cougars men's soccer players
Chicago Fire U-23 players
AC St. Louis players
USL League Two players
USSF Division 2 Professional League players
Association football defenders